Break the Spell is the third studio album by American rock band Daughtry, released on November 21, 2011, by RCA Records. It is a follow-up to their platinum selling album Leave This Town in 2009. On December 15, the album was officially certified Gold.

Background
According to Chris Daughtry, the album is "more upbeat and positive lyrically" and also stated that the album sounds "nothing like the previous two". Chris Daughtry wrote all of the songs with band guitarists Josh Steely and Brian Craddock, bassist Josh Paul, and in collaboration with Marti Frederiksen, Busbee and Brett James. The album was produced by Howard Benson, who also produced their previous two albums.

Prior to the album's release, during the month of November, the tracks "Renegade", "Louder Than Ever" and "Outta My Head" were used by ESPN during some of their programming broadcasts.

Daughtry's official website made a listening party for Break the Spell.

Sales
Break the Spell opened at number 67 on the UK charts. On the Billboard 200, Break the Spell opened at #8 with sales of 129,000

"Start of Something Good" sold 10,000 singles.

Singles
"Renegade" was released as the album's lead single and first rock single. It was released to rock stations on September 27, 2011, and made available for download on October 18, 2011.

"Crawling Back to You" was released at the first pop single from the album, second overall on October 4, 2011. It reached to number 6 on the US Adult Top 40 chart.

"Outta My Head" and "Start of Something Good" were released as the third and fourth singles off the album, respectively.

Track listing
The track listing was announced on October 6 through Daughtry's official site.

Personnel
Credits adapted from album’s liner notes.

Band members
Chris Daughtry – lead vocals, third guitar
Josh Steely – lead guitar, backing vocals
Brian Craddock – rhythm guitar, backing vocals
Josh Paul – bass, backing vocals
Robin Diaz – drums

Additional personnel
Howard Benson – producer, keyboards, programming
Mike Plotnikoff – recording engineer
Chris Lord-Alge – mixing
Keith Armstrong – assistant mix engineer
Nik Karpen – assistant mix engineer
Brad Townsend – additional mix engineering
Andrew Schubert – additional mix engineering
Ted Jensen – mastering
Hatsukazu Inagaki – additional engineering
Paul DeCarli – digital editing and additional engineering
Marc Vangool – guitar technician
Jon Nicholson – drum technician
Howard Benson – keyboards and programming
Lenny Skolnik – programming, strings (track 3)
Jimmy Fahey – assistant engineer (tracks 2, 7-9)
Morgan Stratton – assistant engineer (tracks 2, 7-9)
David Schwerkolt – assistant engineer (tracks 2, 7-9)

Charts and certifications

Weekly charts

Year-end charts

Certifications

References

Daughtry (band) albums
2011 albums
RCA Records albums
19 Recordings albums
Albums produced by Howard Benson